J26 was a smaller-size convergence in what is commonly called the anti-globalization movement. It took place in Calgary, Alberta, Canada in June 2002 during the Group of Eight summit in nearby Kananaskis.

A protest called Take the Capital! took place in Ottawa on the same day, targeting those who could not make it out west.

J26 was also the name of a night march and street party held a year later.

Background 

When the Group of Eight (G8) decided to hold a summit in the mountain resort of Kananaskis, Canada, local activists prepared a response. Initial plans included a large tent city, directly outside the summit area (which was to be surrounded by a fence and defended by thousands of police and soldiers). Plans for this fell through, however, and most G8 protest was confined to the city of Calgary. Calgary, the closest city to Kananaskis, was to house the lower-level G8 delegates who would be linked to the summit via video-link.

Prelude 

In the week before the G8 meetings began, the Group of 6 Billion (G6B) counter-summit was held in Calgary. On Sunday, June 23, the first anti-G8 protest was held, taking the form of a permitted, non-violent Community Solidarity March, during which some 6,000 people marched over a short distance and held a rally near the area where G8 delegates would be housed. Over the next couple of days, a number of other small protests were held.

On the evening of June 25, some 2,000 people took part in the Showdown at the Ho-Down, a march and street party outside of a party being held by Calgary's mayor for lower-level G8 delegates.

J26 

At 6 A.M. on the morning of June 26, protesters began to converge in the east end of the downtown core. The plan was to stage a "snake march" to close down the main thoroughfares in the downtown core, in order to prevent corporate offices from functioning and to disrupt the lower-level G8 meetings. The march route was to be improvised by a nucleus in the centre, based on the situation.

The snake march got under way at 7 A.M. The march moved along steadily, stopping at several corporate targets and creating gridlock in some areas. The city police made only one attempt to turn the march back, and eventually backed down. Riot police remained hidden from view, with several teams of police mounted on bikes shadowing the march. By late morning, some 5,000 protesters had converged on the downtown core, and the snake march came to an end. At this point, the core was broken into "red" and "yellow" zones, with a "green" zone across the river. The zone system was developed for the Summit of the Americas demonstrations in Quebec City the previous year. The red zone was an area for groups intending to practice active civil disobedience with a high risk of arrest. The yellow zone was for demonstrators taking part in non-permitted events that carried a slight risk of arrest.

The zone system was developed for the Summit of the Americas demonstrations in Quebec City the previous year. The red zone was an area for groups intending to practice active civil disobedience with a high risk of arrest. The yellow zone was for demonstrators taking part in non-permitted events that carried a slight risk of arrest. The green zone was for the elderly and faint of heart - here discussion predominated. In the green zone, some partook of glasses of wine, while others chattered away merrily. In the yellow zone, protesters took over Olympic Plaza and staged a Die-In action. In the red zone, a march began, made up in large part by the "black bloc". The march took over two intersections outside of large corporate headquarters and held them while some protesters played a game of soccer in the street and others graffitied the area. Later on, protesters barricaded a McDonald's outlet and scuffled with police. Other protesters attempted to control the streets around the hotel and convention centre where G8 delegates were meeting.

Conclusion 

The J26 protests were much less violent than similar demonstrations in the few previous years. Despite some confrontations with police, no teargas was used and only a handful of people were arrested.

The protests did not significantly impede the G8 meetings from taking place. Many corporate offices in Calgary were shut down for part of the day (in some cases the whole day), but in many cases, this was probably because many office workers simply didn't bother going in to work, knowing that the protests could trap them in gridlock.

The effect of J26 on the movement in general was also mixed. Many demonstrators who had come to the protests expecting a broader confrontation left demoralised. The protests did, however, manage to direct the media's attention to the issues of human rights, social justice and environmentalism that motivated the protesters; the small activist community in Calgary was also bolstered by the demonstrations, leading to the largest protests in the city's history the following year.

See also 
 List of riots and civil unrest in Calgary

References 

Anti-globalization protests
2002 in Alberta
June 2002 events in Canada
2000s in Calgary